Oma's Hideaway, formerly Oma's Takeaway, is a restaurant in Portland, Oregon, United States.

Description and history
Married co-owners Mariah and Thomas Pisha-Duffly opened Oma's Takeaway in April 2020, during the COVID-19 pandemic, when their first restaurant Gado Gado was closed. The pop-up has been described as "Asian stoner food". Later in 2020, Oma's relocated to the former Whiskey Soda Lounge space in southeast Portland's Richmond neighborhood, serving barbecue platters inspired by American, Chinese, and Southeast Asian (including Indonesian and Malaysian) cuisine. The restaurant was inspired by Thomas' Indonesia-born grandmother, whom he called Oma.

The restaurant closed in January 2021, then reopened as Oma's Hideaway on May 22. Oma's previewed the updated menu during a collaborative 420 celebration and fundraising event benefitting Last Prisoner Project. Upon reopening, Oma's served food inspired by Southeast Asian night markets such as noodles, char siu, and Chinese and Malaysian snacks.

See also

 List of Chinese restaurants

References

External links

 

2020 establishments in Oregon
Chinese restaurants in Portland, Oregon
Indonesian restaurants
Malaysian cuisine
Restaurants established in 2020
Richmond, Portland, Oregon
Southeast Asian cuisine